Peteina is a genus of flies in the family Tachinidae.

Species
Peteina erinaceus (Fabricius, 1794)
Peteina hyperdiscalis Aldrich, 1926

References

Dexiinae
Diptera of Europe
Diptera of Asia
Tachinidae genera
Taxa named by Johann Wilhelm Meigen